The Minister of Law and Justice is the head of the Ministry of Law and Justice and one of the cabinet ministers of the Government of India. The first Law and Justice Minister of independent India was B. R. Ambedkar, who served in first Nehru ministry during 1947–52. Kiren Rijiju is currently the Cabinet Minister of Law and Justice of India.

List of Law & Justice Ministers

List of Ministers of State

References

External links
 Law & Justice Minister Ministry, Official website



Union ministers of India
 
India
Lists of government ministers of India